Villeneuve railway station is a railway station in the municipality of Villeneuve, in the Swiss canton of Vaud. It is an intermediate stop on the standard gauge Simplon line of Swiss Federal Railways. The station is one city block east of the Villeneuve ferry terminal, with service to various destinations on Lake Geneva.

Services 
 the following services stop at Villeneuve:

 RegioExpress:

References

External links 
 
 

Railway stations in the canton of Vaud
Swiss Federal Railways stations